Quinn is an Anglicised form of the Irish Ó Coinn or Mac Cuinn. The latter surname means "descendant of Conn". The surname Quinn is also rendered Ó Cuinn or Mac Cuinn in Irish. The surname is borne by several unrelated families in Ireland, especially in the northern province of Ulster and also the counties of Clare, Longford, and Mayo. The most notable family of the name are that of Thomond, a Dalcassian sept, who derive their surname from Niall Ó Cuinn who was slain at the Battle of Clontarf in 1014. This family was formerly represented by the Earls of Dunraven. Another family is that seated in Annaly, who were related to the O'Farrell lords of Longford. Another Quinn family was seated at An Chraobh, County Tyrone and they were related to the O'Neill Kings of Tír Eoghain and for whom they acted as Hereditary Quartermasters. Other families include one seated in Antrim; one seated in Raphoe; and one called Clann Cuain, seated near Castlebar. In the seventeenth century, the surname Quinn was common in Waterford. In 1890, the surname was numerous in Dublin, Tyrone, Antrim, and Roscommon. Quinn is one of the twenty most common surnames in Ireland. It is sometimes said that the surname Quinn is borne by Catholics whilst Quin is borne by Protestants.

Surname

A
Abby Quinn (born 1996), American actress
Adam Quinn (born 1973), American bagpipe player
Aidan Quinn (born 1959), American actor
Alan Quinn (born 1979), Irish footballer
Albert Quinn (1920–2008), English footballer
Alex Quinn (racing driver) (born 2000), British racing driver
Alexander Quinn (disambiguation), multiple people
Alexandra Quinn (born 1973), Canadian porn star
Alison Quinn (born 1977), Australian Paralympic athlete
Alistair Quinn (born 1993), Australian footballer
Andrea Quinn (born 1964), English conductor
Andrew Quinn (born 1983), Irish hurler
Anthony Quinn (disambiguation), multiple people
Aodhan Quinn (born 1992), American soccer player
Austin Quinn (1892–1974), Irish prelate
Austin Quinn-Davidson (born 1979), American politician

B
Barry Quinn (born 1979), Irish footballer
Bart Quinn (1917–2013), American basketball player
Bernard Quinn (born 1947), Scottish footballer
Bernard J. Quinn (1888–1940), American priest
Bertha Quinn (1873–1951), British suffragette
Bill Quinn (1912–1994), American actor
Billy Quinn (disambiguation), multiple people
Bob Quinn (disambiguation), multiple people
Bradley Quinn (born 1976), Northern Irish photographer
Brady Quinn (born 1984), American football player
Brandon Quinn (born 1977), American actor
Brendan Quinn (born 1960), Irish runner
Brian Quinn (disambiguation), multiple people

C
Cameron Quinn, American lawyer and professor
Carl Quinn, Canadian singer-songwriter
Carmel Quinn (1925–2021), Irish-American entertainer
Carolyn Quinn (born 1961), British journalist
Celia Quinn, Irish camogie player
Charles Quinn (1930–2013), American journalist
Chris Quinn (born 1983), American basketball player
Chris Quinn (rugby league) (born 1968), Australian rugby league footballer
Christine Quinn (born 1966), American politician
Christopher Quinn (disambiguation), multiple people
Clare Quinn, Irish soprano
Clark Quinn, American brigadier general
Colin Quinn (born 1959), American actor and comedian
C. Patrick Quinn (1900–1969), American politician

D
Daire Quinn, Irish sportsperson
Damien Quinn (disambiguation), multiple people
Damon Quinn (born 1964), Northern Irish actor
Daniel Quinn (disambiguation), multiple people
Danny Quinn (born 1964), Italian actor
David Quinn (disambiguation), multiple people
Declan Quinn (born 1957), American cinematographer
Deirdre Quinn (born 1973), American model
Deirdre Quinn (entrepreneur), American businesswoman
Dennis Michael Quinn (1944–2021), American historian
Derry Quinn (1918–1987), English novelist and screenwriter
Don Quinn (1900–1967), American comedy writer
Doris M. Quinn (1923–2003), American politician

E
Ed Quinn (born 1968), American model
Eddie Quinn (1906–1965), American wrestling manager
Edel Quinn (1907–1944), Irish missionary and saint
Edmond Thomas Quinn (1868–1929), American sculptor
Edward Quinn (1920–1997), Irish photographer
Edward W. Quinn, American politician
Eimear Quinn (born 1972), Irish singer
Elmer F. Quinn (1895–1952), American politician 
Emmett Quinn (1877–1930), Canadian ice hockey executive and businessman
Ethan Quinn (born 2004), American tennis player
Evans Quinn (born 1983), Nicaraguan boxer

F
Feargal Quinn (1936–2019), Irish politician and businessman
Felix Patrick Quinn (1874–1961), Canadian industrialist and politician
Frances Quinn (born 1981), British baker
Frances Elizabeth Quinn, Irish-American soldier
Francesco Quinn (1963–2011), American actor
Francis Quinn (1921–2019), American prelate
Francis Quinn (racing driver) (1903–1931), American racing driver
Frank Quinn (disambiguation), multiple people
Freddy Quinn (born 1931), Austrian singer and actor

G
Gavin Quinn, Australian rugby league footballer
Ged Quinn (born 1963), English artist
Geraldine Quinn (born 1975), Australian songwriter
Gerard Quinn, American law professor
Gerry Quinn (hurler) (born 1980), Irish sportsperson
Gerry Quinn (sportsman, born 1917) (1917–1968), Irish cricketer and rugby union footballer
Glenn Quinn (1970–2002), Irish actor
Gordon Quinn (born 1942), American documentary filmmaker
Gordon Quinn (footballer) (born 1932), English footballer
Graham Quinn (disambiguation), multiple people

H
Hayden Quinn (born 1986), Australian chef
Helen Quinn (born 1943), Australian physicist

I
I. T. Quinn (1887–1972), American conservationist
Isaac N. Quinn (1795–1865), American politician
Ivan Quinn (1899–1969), American football player

J
Jack Quinn (disambiguation), multiple people
Jacqueline Quinn (born 1965), Irish fashion designer
James Quinn (disambiguation), multiple people
Jamie Quinn (actor), Scottish actor
Jane Bryant Quinn (born 1939), American financial journalist
Jason Quinn (chef), American chef
Jeanne Quinn (born 1953), American ceramic artist
Jeff Quinn (born 1962), American college football coach
Jennifer Quinn, American mathematician
Jimmy Quinn (disambiguation), multiple people
Joanna Quinn (born 1962), English film director
Joanna R. Quinn (born 1973), Canadian political scientist
Joe Quinn (disambiguation), multiple people
John Quinn (disambiguation), multiple people
Johnny Quinn (born 1983), American football player and bobsledder
Jonathan Quinn (born 1975), American football player
Jonny Quinn (born 1972), Irish drummer
Joseph Quinn (disambiguation), multiple people
Josephine Crawley Quinn, American archaeologist
Judy Quinn (born 1974), Canadian writer
Julia Quinn (born 1970), American author
Justin Quinn (born 1968), Irish poet

K
Karla Quinn (born 1988), British figure skater
Kate Quinn, American writer
Keith Quinn (disambiguation), multiple people
Kellin Quinn (born 1986), American singer
Kelly Quinn (born 1963), American football player
Kenneth Quinn (cricketer) (born 1971), Antiguan cricketer
Kenneth M. Quinn (born 1942), American diplomat
Kermit Quinn, American singer
Kevin Quinn (disambiguation), multiple people
Kimberly Quinn (born 1961), American journalist
Kimberly Quinn (actress), American actress

L
Larry Quinn (born 1963), American lacrosse player
Larry Quinn (ice hockey) (born 1952), American ice hockey executive
Lawrie Quinn (born 1956), English politician
Liam Quinn (born 1949), American-Irish army officer
Lisa Quinn (born 1967), American television host
Lochlann Quinn (born 1940), Irish businessman and philanthropist
Lonnie Quinn (born 1963), American weatherman
Lorenzo Quinn (born 1966), Italian artist and sculptor
Louis Quinn (1915–1988), American actor
Louis Joseph Quinn (1928–2007), English missionary
Louise Quinn (born 1990), Irish footballer
Lucy Quinn (born 1993), English footballer

M
Maire Quinn (1872–1947), Irish actress
Marc Quinn (born 1964), English artist
Marcus Quinn (born 1959), American football player
Marguerite Quinn, American politician
Mark Quinn (born 1974), American baseball player
Martha Quinn (born 1959), American media personality
Martin Quinn (disambiguation), multiple people
Marty Quinn (disambiguation), multiple people
Mary Alice Quinn (1920–1935), American schoolgirl
Mary Ellen Quinn (born 1949), American librarian
Matt Quinn (born 1993), English-New Zealand cricketer
Matthew Quinn (disambiguation), multiple people
Maureen E. Quinn, American civil servant
Maz Quinn (born 1976), New Zealand surfer
Michael Quinn (disambiguation), multiple people
Mickey Quinn, Irish Gaelic footballer
Micky Quinn (born 1962), English footballer
Mike Quinn (disambiguation), multiple people
Molly Quinn (born 1993), American actress

N
Nancy Quinn (1919–2014), American public figure
Naomi Quinn (1939–2019), American anthropologist
Ned Quinn (1923–2019), Irish hurler
Nesanel Quinn (1910–2005), American rabbi and educator 
Neville Quinn (1908–1934), South African cricketer
Niall Quinn (disambiguation), multiple people
Nicholas Quinn (disambiguation), multiple people
Noel Quinn (born 1962), British banking executive
Noelle Quinn (born 1985), American basketball player

O
Oisín Quinn (born 1969), Irish politician
Ollie Quinn (1893–1949), American mob boss
Owen J. Quinn (born 1941), American parachutist

P
Padraig Quinn (1899–1974), Irish officer
Paddy Quinn (disambiguation), multiple people
Pat Quinn (disambiguation), multiple people
Patricia Quinn (disambiguation), multiple people
Paul Quinn (disambiguation), multiple people
Paula Quinn (born 1961), American novelist
Percy Quinn (1876–1944), Canadian athlete and ice hockey executive
Peter Quinn (disambiguation), multiple people
Philip L. Quinn (1940–2004), American philosopher

Q
Quinn (born 1995), Canadian soccer player and Olympic gold medalist

R
R. Joseph Quinn (born 1942), American lawyer, judge, and politician
Raven Quinn (born 1984), American musician
Ray Quinn (born 1988), English actor
Ray Quinn (footballer) (1913–1973), Australian rules footballer
Rebecca Quinn (disambiguation), multiple people
Richard Quinn (disambiguation), multiple people
Rick Quinn Jr. (born 1965), American politician
Rob Quinn (born 1976), Irish footballer
Robert Quinn (disambiguation), multiple people
Rocco Quinn (born 1986), Scottish footballer
Roderic Quinn (1867–1949), Australian poet
Rodney Quinn (born 1960), Australian jockey
Roman Quinn (born 1993), American baseball player
Romaine Quinn (born 1990), American politician
Ron Quinn (born 1961), Australian rugby league footballer
Roseann Quinn (1944–1973), American teacher
Roy Quinn (1919–2001), Australian rules footballer
Ruairi Quinn (born 1946), Irish politician
Ryan Quinn (born 1987), American martial artist
Ryan Quinn (curler) (born 1978), American curler

S
Sally Quinn (born 1941), American journalist and author
San Quinn (born 1977), American rapper
Seabury Quinn (1889–1969), American author
Seamus Quinn, Irish Gaelic footballer
Sean Quinn (disambiguation), multiple people
Shawn Quinn, American bridge player
Sheila Quinn (1920–2016), British nurse
Sinéad Quinn (born 1980), Irish singer
Snoozer Quinn (1907–1949), American jazz guitarist
Stephen Quinn (born 1986), Irish footballer
Steve Quinn (born 1946), American football player
Steve Quinn (rugby league) (1951–2016), English rugby league footballer
Susan Quinn (born 1940), American writer

T
Tad Quinn (1881–1946), American baseball player
Talesha Quinn (born 1989), Australian rugby league footballer
Ted Quinn (born 1958), American musician
Teddy Quinn (born 1958), American performer
Terence J. Quinn (1836–1878), American politician
Thomas Quinn (disambiguation), multiple people
Tim Quinn (born 1949), Australian politician
T. J. Quinn, American investigative reporter
Tom Quinn (disambiguation), multiple people
Tomás Quinn, Irish Gaelic footballer
Tommie Quinn (1927–1970), Argentine field hockey player
Tommy Quinn (1908–1969), Australian rules footballer
Tony Quinn (disambiguation), multiple people
Trey Quinn (born 1995), American football player
T. Vincent Quinn (1903–1982), American politician

W
Wayne Quinn (born 1976), English footballer
William Quinn (disambiguation), multiple people
Wimpy Quinn (1918–1954), American baseball player

Z
Zoë Quinn (born 1987), American video game developer

Fictional characters
Billy Quinn, a character in the 1989 American-Canadian fantasy drama movie Prancer
Daniel Quinn, the main character in Paul Auster's City of Glass, the first of three novels in The New York Trilogy
Doctor Quentin Q. Quinn in Sealab 2021
Dottie Quinn, a character in the American psychological thriller television series You
Forty Quinn, a character in the American psychological thriller television series You
Michaela A. Quinn, in the American television series Dr. Quinn, Medicine Woman
Harley Quinn, a DC comics character
Joey Quinn, a police detective in Dexter
Jonas Quinn in the sci-fi television series Stargate SG-1
Love Quinn, a character in the American psychological thriller television series You
 Roberta "Summer" Quinn, a character in the American action drama TV series Baywatch
Robbie Quinn in the soap opera Fair City
Tom Quinn (Spooks), the lead character in the British spy-thriller series Spooks

See also
Attorney General Quinn (disambiguation), a disambiguation page with Attorneys General surnamed "Quinn"
General Quinn (disambiguation), a disambiguation page with Generals surnamed "Quinn"
Governor Quinn (disambiguation), a disambiguation page with Governors surnamed "Quinn"
Quinn (soccer) (born 1995), Canadian soccer player
O'Quinn, a page with people with the surname "O'Quinn"
Quin (disambiguation), a disambiguation page for "Quin"
Quinn (given name), a page with people with the given name "Quinn"

References

External links
 Quinn at Araltas

English-language surnames
Anglicised Irish-language surnames
Septs of the Dál gCais
Surnames of Irish origin